Deyi Baideti – Gejjegiri Nandanodu is a 2019 Indian Tulu-language historical film directed and produced by Suryoday Permapalli. The film is presented by Lakshman K Ameen under the banner of Sankri Motion Pictures. The film's soundtracks was composed by B Bhaskar Rao, while the score was composed by Manikanth Kadri. The film was released on 11 January 2019. The film won Karnataka State Film Awards for Best Regional Language Film, Best Director, and Best Singer.

Plot
The film is an adaptation on the life of Deyi Baideti, mother of Koti and Chennayya, the twin warriors of Tulunadu, who fought valiantly on battle ground and died about five hundred years ago.

Cast
 Soujanya Hegde
 Kaajal Kunder
 Seetha Kote
 Amit Rao
 Chetan Rai Mani
 Manju Bhashini 
 Kirloskar Satya

Release
The film was released on January 11, 2019. Deyi Baidethi became the first Tulu film to be screened at Mysuru Dasara Film Festival in 2019.

Awards
The film won awards for Best Regional Language Film, Best Director, and Best Singer at Karnataka State Film Awards 2018.

References

External links
 

Tulu-language films
2019 films